Paratrachys is a genus of "jewel beetles" in the subfamily Polycestinae and tribe Paratrachyini.

Species
Paratrachys contains the following species:

 Paratrachys australius Bellamy & Williams, 1995
 Paratrachys bakeri Obenberger, 1924
 Paratrachys biroi Holynski, 1992
 Paratrachys chinensis Obenberger, 1958
 Paratrachys cornutus Bílý, 1994
 Paratrachys cuneiformis (Deyrolle, 1864)
 Paratrachys fergussonicus (Kerremans, 1900)
 Paratrachys fisheri Obenberger, 1924
 Paratrachys hederae Saunders, 1873
 Paratrachys hederoides Cobos, 1980
 Paratrachys hypocritus (Fairmaire, 1889)
 Paratrachys kannegieteri Obenberger, 1924
 Paratrachys kurosawai Holynski, 1992
 Paratrachys marylae Holynski, 1992
 Paratrachys mixtipubescens Kurosawa, 1985
 Paratrachys nadjus Cobos, 1980
 Paratrachys nigricans (Kerremans, 1890)
 Paratrachys nigritus (Deyrolle, 1864)
 Paratrachys pilifrons (Kerremans, 1900)
 Paratrachys princeps Kurosawa, 1976
 Paratrachys queenslandicus Bellamy & Williams, 1995
 Paratrachys sinicolus Obenberger, 1958
 Paratrachys srogli Obenberger, 1932
 Paratrachys strandi Obenberger, 1932
 Paratrachys tonyi Holynski, 1992

References

Buprestidae genera